Brendon Clark is a former professional bull rider.

Clark was one of only a few riders to earn $1 million riding bulls. According to the Australian Broadcasting Corporation, he was Australia's most successful bull rider.

Clark was born September 24, 1980, in Morpeth, New South Wales on the Hunter River. In 2008, Clark received six concussions and started wearing a helmet. In 2009 he was hospitalized after a bull stepped on his stomach and chest in Omaha, Nebraska. He retired from bull riding in 2013. As of 2015, Clark lives in California, working as a horse whisperer and television commentator. The Brendon Clark Invitational, a competition for bull riders held annually in Newcastle, New South Wales, is named after Clark.

References 

Living people
Bull riders
1980 births
People from New South Wales